Luke Hedger (born 6 December 1995 in Yate, Bristol) is a British motorcycle racer. He was the British Motostar champion in 2012 and the National Superstock 600 champion in 2013. He currently competes in the National Superstock Championship, aboard a Suzuki GSXR1000.

Career statistics

Grand Prix motorcycle racing

By season

Races by year

References

External links

British motorcycle racers
Living people
1995 births
Moto3 World Championship riders
People from Yate